Kentridge High School is a (senior) high school that is located on  in Kent, Washington.  It is the second-oldest  and second-largest high school by area (while the largest by population) in the Kent School District. It primarily serves students in the northeastern region of the district.

Academics
Kentridge offers Advanced Placement courses in English Language and Composition, English Literature and Composition, Computer Science, Art, Art History, Calculus (AB and BC), Statistics, Human Geography, US History, US Government and Politics, Biology, Chemistry, Environmental Science, Physics (B), Music Theory, and Psychology. As an alternative to AP classes, Kentridge also offers juniors and seniors Running Start.
Languages available for students to take are French, Spanish, Japanese, and American Sign Language (ASL). All of the languages have courses up to the 4th year or 7-8 level.
Kentridge's mascot is known as Charlie the Charger which is displayed as a horse.

Extracurricular activities

Athletics

Kentridge is a part of the Cascade Division of the North Puget Sound League as of the 2016-17 school year. Previously, it was a part of the North Division in Washington's 4A South Puget Sound League. The school has a lasting rivalry with Kentwood High School.

Recent state championships:
1st in 1973 for boys football
1st in 1989 for volleyball.
1st in 1992 for boys basketball
1st in 1994 for boys swimming and diving
1st in 1995 for boys swimming and diving
1st in 2002 for fastpitch softball
1st in 2008 for small varsity cheerleading
1st in 2017 for girls basketball

Notable alumni

Ely Allen, NASL player
Jason Ellis (basketball), former professional basketball player
Kai Ellis, Canadian Football League player
Marcus Hahnemann, Major League Soccer player
Nicole Joraanstad, Olympic Curling Team Member
David Patton, Major League Baseball player
Brandon Prideaux, former Major League Soccer player
Mason Tobin, Major League Baseball player
Gary Bell Jr., professional basketball player
Olivia Van Der Jagt, National Women's Soccer League player
Tanner Conner, National Football League player

References

High schools in King County, Washington
Education in Kent, Washington
Educational institutions established in 1968
1968 establishments in Washington (state)
South Puget Sound League
Public high schools in Washington (state)